Sunethra Ranasinghe was a Sri Lankan politician and a former member of the Parliament of Sri Lanka. She was elected to the seat of Dehiwala-Mount Lavinia in a by-election in 1977, replacing her father S. de Silva Jayasinghe who died whilst in office. She is a Member of the United National Party. She served as the Minister of Health.

References

Living people
Year of birth missing (living people)
Members of the 8th Parliament of Sri Lanka